Baron, Jan Albin Goetz-Okocimski (né Jan Albin Götz; born 18 July 1864, Okocim, Galicia – died 24 April 1931, Okocim, Poland) was a Polish brewer of German ancestry, head of Okocim Brewery, a philanthropist and patron of the arts, a "Freiherr" (baron) of the Habsburg Empire, a conservative politician, activist and a member of the Austrian parliament and Polish sejm.

Born to Johann Evangelist Götz and Albina Götz in 1864, in 1911 he polonized his name to "Goetz-Okocimski". At the end of the 19th century, together with his wife, baroness Zofia née Sumińska, he built a palace in Brzesko, in Austrian architectural style, surrounded by an English garden. From 1904 until his death he was the sole owner of Okocim brewery. In 1925 for his social activism, as well as business and agricultural contributions to the industry of newly independent Poland he was awarded the Commander's Cross of Order of Polonia Restituta. He was the father of Antoni Jan Goetz.

References

1864 births
1931 deaths
People from Brzesko
People from the Kingdom of Galicia and Lodomeria
Polish people of German descent
Barons of Austria
Nonpartisan Bloc for Cooperation with the Government politicians
Members of the Austrian House of Deputies (1897–1900)
Members of the Austrian House of Deputies (1911–1918)
Members of the Diet of Galicia and Lodomeria
Members of the Legislative Sejm of the Second Polish Republic
Senators of the Second Polish Republic (1928–1930)
Recipients of the Order of Polonia Restituta